The Canada Pension Plan (CPP) is a contributory, earnings-related social insurance program. It forms one of the two major components of Canada's public retirement income system, the other component being Old Age Security (OAS). Other parts of Canada's retirement system are private pensions, either employer-sponsored or from tax-deferred individual savings (known in Canada as a Registered Retirement Savings Plan). As of Jun 30, 2022, the CPP Investment Board manages over C$523 billion in investment assets for the Canada Pension Plan on behalf of 20 million Canadians. CPPIB is one of the world's biggest pension funds.

Description
The CPP mandates all employed Canadians who are 18 years of age and over to contribute a prescribed portion of their earnings income to a federally administered pension plan. The plan is administered by Employment and Social Development Canada on behalf of employees in all provinces and territories except Quebec, which operates an equivalent plan, the Quebec Pension Plan. Because the Constitutional authority for pensions is shared between the provincial and federal governments, stewardship for the CPP is jointly shared. As a result, major changes to the CPP, including those that alter how benefits are calculated, require the approval of at least seven Canadian provinces representing at least two-thirds of the country's population.

Provinces may choose to opt out of the Canada Pension Plan (as Quebec did in 1965), but must offer a comparable plan to its residents. In addition, under section 94A of the Canadian Constitution, pensions are a provincial responsibility, so any province may establish an additional/supplementary plan anytime.

History
The Liberal government of Prime Minister Lester B. Pearson in 1965 first established the Canadian Pension Plan.

Benefits
The primary CPP benefit is the monthly retirement pension. Currently, this is equal to 25 per cent of the average earnings on which CPP contributions were made over the entire working life of a contributor from age 18 to 65 in constant dollars. The earnings upon which contributions are made are subject to an annual limit, which, in 2020, is $58,700. However, under changes being phased in by 2025, the pension benefit will rise to 33.33 per cent of earnings on which contributions were made, and the maximum amount of income covered by the CPP will rise by 14 percent from the projected 2025 limit of $69,700 to $79,400.

The CPP enhancement will serve as a top-up to the existing, or base, CPP. For individuals who work and make contributions in 2019 or later, enhanced components of benefits will be calculated and added to the base portion of the benefit. These calculations are similar, but follow different formulae.

When calculating the base portion of the CPP, there is a general drop out provision that enables the lower-earnings years in a contributor's contributory period to be dropped from the calculation of the average. Since 2014, the lowest 17 percent of earnings are dropped in this way, accounting for up to eight years of contributory earnings.

Benefits under the CPP enhancement will be calculated based on a forty-year period, taking the best 40 years to calculate the benefit. This calculation effectively allows seven years to be dropped out of the benefit calculation (for an individual who begins contributing at age 18 and ends at age 65).

In October 2018, average monthly benefits for new retirement pension (taken at age 65) was just over $664.00 per month and the maximum amount in 2019 was $1,154.58 per month. Monthly benefits are adjusted every year based on the Consumer Price Index. CPP benefit payments are taxable as ordinary income.

The standard age to receive the retirement pension is age 65, however, individuals may begin collecting a permanently reduced pension as early as 60, or defer until age 70 to increase the monthly payment. For those who take the pension early (the majority), the reduction factor is 0.6 per cent for each month you receive it before age 65 (to a maximum reduction of 36 per cent at age 60). For those who defer, the adjustment rate is 0.7 per cent for each month that one delays in receiving it up to a maximum increase of 42 per cent at age 70. There is no financial benefit to delaying beyond age 70.

The CPP also provides disability pensions to eligible workers under the age of 65 who become disabled in a severe and prolonged fashion, and a monthly survivor's pension to the spouse or common-law partners of contributors who die (having made sufficient contributions).

An application must be filed at least six months in advance in order to receive CPP benefits. If an application for disability pension is denied, an appeal can be made for reconsideration, and then to the Social Security Tribunal. All CPP benefits in pay are indexed annually to the Consumer Price Index.

Contribution rates

1966 to 1996
From 1966 to 1986, the contribution rate was 3.6 per cent. The rate was 1.8 per cent for employees (and a like amount for their employers) and 3.6 per cent in respect of self-employed earnings. Contribution rates started rising by 0.2 per cent per year in 1987. By 1997, this had reached combined rates of 6 per cent of pensionable earnings.

1996 reforms
By the mid-1990s, the 3.6 per cent contribution rate was not sufficient to keep up with Canada's aging population. and it was concluded that the "pay-as-you-go" structure would lead to excessively high contribution rates within 20 years or so, due to Canada's changing demographics, increased life expectancy of Canadians, a changing economy, benefit improvements, and increased usage of disability benefits (all as referenced in the Chief Actuary's study of April 2007, noted above). The same study reports that the reserve fund was expected to run out by 2015. This impending pension crisis sparked an extensive review by the federal and provincial governments in 1996. As a part of the major review process, the federal government actively conducted consultations with the Canadian public to solicit suggestions, recommendations, and proposals on how the CPP could be restructured to achieve sustainability once again. As a direct result of this public consultation process and internal review of the CPP, the following key changes were proposed and jointly approved by the Federal and provincial governments in 1997:

 Increase total CPP annual contribution rates (employer/employee combined) from 6 per cent of pensionable earnings in 1997 to 9.9 per cent by 2003.
 Continuously seek out ways to reduce CPP administration and operating costs.
 Move towards a hybrid structure to take advantage of investment earnings on accumulated assets. Instead of a "pay-as-you-go" structure, the CPP is expected to be 20 per cent funded by 2014, such funding ratio to constantly increase thereafter towards 30 per cent by 2075 (that is, the CPP Reserve Fund will equal 30 per cent of the "liabilities" - or accrued pension obligations).
 Create the CPP Investment Board (CPPIB).
 Review the CPP and CPPIB every 3 years.

As of 2019, the prescribed employee contribution rate was 4.95 per cent of a salaried worker's gross employment income between $3,500 and $57,400, up to a maximum contribution of $2,668. The employer matches the employee contribution, effectively doubling the contributions of the employee. Self-employed workers must pay both halves of the contribution, or 9.9 per cent of pensionable income, when filing their income tax return. These rates have been in effect since 2003.

2017 reforms
The Federal Government and its provincial counterparts moved to enhance the Canada Pension Plan to provide working Canadians with more income in retirement. These changes were principally motivated by the declining share of the workforce that was covered by an employer defined-benefit pension plan, which had fallen from 48 per cent of men in 1971 to 25 per cent by 2011. They were given additional impetus by moves on the part of the government of Ontario to launch the Ontario Retirement Pension Plan, a supplementary provincial pension plan intended to begin in 2018.

Unlike the existing, or base, CPP, the enhancement to the Canada Pension Plan will be fully funded, meaning that benefits under the enhancement will slowly accrue each year as individuals work and make contributions. Additionally, the enhancement of the Canada Pension Plan will be phased-in over a period of seven years, starting in 2019. When fully mature, the enhanced CPP will provide a replacement rate of one third (33.33 per cent) of covered earnings, up from the quarter (25 per cent) provided prior to the enhancement. Additionally, the maximum amount of income covered by the CPP will increase by 14 per cent by 2025 (projected by the Chief Actuary of Canada to be $79,400 in 2025, compared to the projected normal limit of $69,700 in the same year in the 28th Actuarial Report on the CPP). The combination of the increased replacement rate and increased earnings limit will result in individuals receiving retirement pensions 33 per cent to 50 per cent higher, depending on their earnings across their working years. (The maximum retirement pension will increase by 50 per cent, but will require 40 years of contributions on earnings at the new maximum). Workers earning the 2016 maximum covered wage of $54,900 a year would receive an additional $4,390 annually (approximately $365.83 monthly).

To finance the expanded pensions and maintain the soundness of the plan, contributions to the CPP from workers and their employers will each rise 1 per cent from current levels, to 5.95 per cent over the existing band of covered earnings. This increase will be phased in over 5 years, starting in 2019. The increase to the earnings threshold will be phased in over 2 years, starting in 2024. Workers and their employers will contribute 4 per cent on earnings in this range (which is to say earnings above the normal earnings limit and below the new increased one). To ease the impact of the increased contribution on near-term disposable income, worker contributions will become tax-deductible.

Funding

Description
The base CPP is funded on a "steady-state" basis, with its current contribution rate set so that it will remain constant for the next 75 years, by accumulating a reserve fund sufficient to stabilize the asset/expenditure and funding ratios over time. Such a system is a hybrid between a fully funded one and a "pay-as-you-go" plan. In other words, assets held in the CPP fund are by themselves insufficient to pay for all future benefits accrued to date but sufficient to prevent contributions from rising any further. While a sustainable path for this particular plan, given the indefinite existence of a government, it is not typical of other public or private sector pension plans. A study published in April 2007 by the CPP's chief actuary showed that this type of funding method is "robust and appropriate" given reasonable assumptions about future conditions.

The enhancement to the CPP will be fully funded, such that each generation will contribute and pay for the benefits they receive. Contributions made to the enhancement will be directed into a separate account.

The chief actuary submits a report to Parliament every three years on the financial status of the plan. Future reports will report on both the base and enhanced components of the Plan.

Assets
As noted in the 27th Actuarial Report on the Canada Pension Plan, if one uses the 'closed group approach', the Canada Pension Plan has an enormous unfunded liability. As at December 31, 2015, the unfunded liability was $884 billion, which is the difference between CPP's liabilities of $1.169 trillion and the CPP's assets of $285 billion.

Unfunded liability
While the unfunded liability has been increasing with every published Actuarial Report, the assets as a percentage of liabilities using the closed group approach has also been increasing since the 1996 reforms. The unfunded liability reported in the last few reports are:

Using the 'open group approach' ("one that includes all current and future participants of a plan, where the
plan is considered to be ongoing into the future, that is, over an extended time horizon") the plan is reported to have assets in excess of $2.5 trillion. This approach uses a different definition of the term "assets". "Assets" are the sum of: (i) the CPP's current assets and (ii) the present value of future contributions for the next 150 years, totalling $2.544 trillion.

Unlike most pension plans, the unfunded liability is not reported on the balance sheet of the Canada Pension Plan's financial statements. Consequently, the balance sheet reports that the CPP's assets exceed its liabilities by $269 billion as at March 31, 2015.

CPP investment board

Under the direction of then Finance Minister Paul Martin, the CPP Investment Board (CPPIB) was created in 1997 as an organization independent of the government to monitor and invest the funds held by the CPP. In turn, the CPP Investment Board created the CPP Reserve Fund. The CPP Investment Board is a crown corporation created by an Act of Parliament. It reports quarterly on its performance, has a professional management team to oversee the operation of various aspects of the CPP reserve fund and also to plan changes in direction, and a board of directors that is accountable to but independent from the federal government. The board reports annually to Parliament through the federal Minister of Finance.

Quebec Pension Plan
Quebec is the only province in Canada that opted out of the CPP in which the government of Quebec runs its own pension program. The Quebec Pension Plan (QPP; French: Régime des rentes du Québec; RRQ) is the province of Quebec's own version of the Canada Pension Plan. The QPP is managed by Retraite Québec, which was formed from a merger of the Commission administrative des régimes de retraite et d'assurances (CARRA) and the Régie des rentes du Québec (RRQ) in 2016. Closely mirroring the CPP, the QPP is a contributory earnings-related pension plan that pays benefits in the event of the earner becoming disabled, retiring, or dying. Both Quebec and the federal government tax benefits paid from the QPP.

Increase in contribution rate
The contribution rate was 9.9 per cent prior to 2012. In accordance with the 2011-12 Budget of the Government of Quebec, the contribution rates were increased by 0.15 per cent per year for six years from 2012 to 2017. Consequently, the contribution rate increased to 10.8 per cent for 2017 and subsequent years.

See also
 Fiscal imbalance in Australia
 Pensions in Canada

References

External links
 Canada Pension Plan Act
 CPP and payroll calculations
 CPP Investment Board website 
 CPP website
 2017 Annual Report
 21st Actuarial Report (as at December 31, 2003)
 23rd Actuarial Report (as at December 31, 2006)
 25th Actuarial Report (as at December 31, 2009) 
 26th Actuarial Report (as at December 31, 2012)
 27th Actuarial Report (as at December 31, 2015)
 The Régie des rentes website

 
Retirement in Canada
1966 establishments in Canada
Public pension funds in Canada
Pensions in Canada
Social security in Canada
Lester B. Pearson